Datura lanosa is a species of Datura.  Some contemporary botanists classify this plant not as a separate species, but as a variety of Datura wrightii or Datura innoxia.

This Datura is a small shrub, producing trumpet shaped flowers. The fruit is small, with thorns carrying many seeds.

Cultivation
Datura lanosa is grown in yards or gardens as an ornamental plant and is native to Mexico.

References

lanosa
Flora of Mexico
Garden plants of North America
Desert fruits